Maltese  may refer to:

 Someone or something of, from, or related to Malta
 Maltese alphabet
 Maltese cuisine
 Maltese culture
 Maltese language, the Semitic language spoken by Maltese people
 Maltese people, people from Malta or of Maltese descent

Animals
 Maltese dog
 Maltese goat
 Maltese cat
 Maltese tiger

Other uses
 Maltese cross
 Maltese (surname), a surname (including a list of people with the name)

See also
 
The Maltese Falcon (disambiguation)

Language and nationality disambiguation pages